Gătaia (archaically Gotthal) is a town in Timiș County, Romania. It administers five villages: Butin, Percosova, Sculia, Șemlacu Mare, and Șemlacu Mic. Declared a town in 2004, it also administered four other villages until that time, when they were split off to form Birda commune.

Name

Geography 

Gătaia lies on both banks of the Bârzava River. Some of the villages (Șemlacu Mare, Șemlacu Mic, Butin and Percosova) are located south of Gătaia around the Șumigu hill, an extinct volcano in the Tisa Plain, along the Moravița, Crivaia and Clopodia streams, tributaries to the left of Bârzava, and Sculia is also located on the Bârzava River but west of Gătaia, occupying the northernmost position in this administrative unit. Gătaia connects Timișoara and Reșița both by rail and by national road 58.

History 
The first recorded mention of Gătaia dates from 1323. A Hungarian document from 1343 states that there were the settlements of Superior Gatal ("Upper Gătaia") and Inferior Gatal ("Lower Gătaia"), which merged over time. In many documents from the Middle Ages, Romanian names such as Dunca or Dragul appear in connection with the inhabitants.

For a long time this locality belonged to Krassó County and only at the end of the 17th century, in 1779, it was incorporated into Temes County. Gătaia, known then as Gattaja, was inhabited during the Austrian occupation of Banat. According to Hungarian historian , Gătaia was a "Vlach" (Romanian) settlement at that time. In 1823 Gătaia was sold by tax authorities to the feudal lords Ludovic and Carol Gorove, who decided to colonize it with Hungarians. By the end of the 19th century, Hungarians were already in the majority.

In 2004 Gătaia received the status of a town, having in its administration the localities of Butin, Percosova, Sculia, Șemlacu Mare and Șemlacu Mic. At the same time, the villages of Berecuța, Birda, Mânăstire and Sângeorge, separated from the former commune and formed the commune of Birda.

Demographics 

Gătaia had a population of 5,861 inhabitants at the 2011 census, down 5% from the 2002 census. Most inhabitants are Romanians (72.31%), larger minorities being represented by Hungarians (11.16%) and Slovaks (7.3%). For 6.71% of the population, ethnicity is unknown. By religion, most inhabitants are Orthodox (61.1%), but there are also minorities of Roman Catholics (18.55%), Pentecostals (7.2%), Reformed (1.66%) and Adventists (1.02%). For 6.69% of the population, religious affiliation is unknown.

Education 
Education has been documented in Gătaia since 1776, the first confessional school existing here since 1781. During the reign of Empress Maria Theresa, the first laws dealing with the organization of education appeared. After 1823, for 50 years, in Gătaia there were two confessional schools: Romanian Orthodox and Hungarian Catholic.

At present, the Gătaia Theoretical High School has a number of 25 classrooms in three buildings and four arranged in the building of the boys' boarding school. The second building was completed in 1969, and the third building in 1978. About 750 students study at the high school in Gătaia. Primary schools (1–4) also exist in Sculia (three classrooms), Șemlacu Mare (four classrooms), Șemlacu Mic (four classrooms), Butin (four classrooms) and Percosova (four classrooms).

Healthcare 
The first sanitary precinct was established by order of the Minister of Health of the Austro-Hungarian Empire in 1901, when the first state physician, Ludovic Kardos, was appointed. About 9,000 people from the commune and the neighboring villages were assigned here. From 1968, the sanitary precinct was transformed into a health center, which included the entire territory of the commune, with three sanitary dispensaries.

The Gătaia Psychiatric Hospital started operating in December 1966, being built on the site of a former abandoned barracks, in the immediate vicinity of a locust and fir forest. The founding fathers of this hospital were professor Eduard Pamfil and lecturer Ștefan Stössel. The hospital is the practice base for the students of the West University of Timișoara, the specializations psychology and social assistance, part of the psychiatrists and psychologists of the hospital being associate teachers of the West University.

The first private pharmacy was established in 1890; currently there are two pharmacies in the town.

References 

Populated places in Timiș County
Localities in Romanian Banat
Towns in Romania